Rheum officinale, the Chinese rhubarb, or Indian rhubarb is a rhubarb from the family Polygonaceae native to China. In Chinese it is called yào yòng dà huáng, literally meaning medicinal rhubarb.

Description
A perennial typically to 2m in height.

Similar species

Karyotypy
R. officinale has a chromosome count of 2n=44.

Distribution
This species is endemic to southeast China, where it occurs in the provinces of Guizhou, southwestern Henan, western Hubei, Shaanxi, Sichuan, Yunnan and possibly Fujian.

Uses
Leaf petiole said to be edible raw or cooked.

In Indonesia, especially in Java where it is known as klembak in Javanese, and it is usually dried, and mixed with tobacco and frankincense to create a rokok klembak menyan, a traditional Javanese frankincense cigarette.

Traditional medicinal uses 
The roots of Rheum officinale are used in traditional Chinese medicine. They are considered as a kind of "cold" herbs, used as a laxative in patients with constipation, sometimes accompanied by fever and even delirium. It is thought that rhubarbs can improve poor circulation, especially being helpful to remove bodily aggregates which result from poor circulation.

In Chinese traditional medicine, R. officinale, in combination with a large variety of other herbs and modern medicine, has been used for the treatment of hepatitis B, although the results were found to be inconclusive.

Cultivation 
Hardy to USDA Zone 7.

See also 
 Chinese herbology 50 fundamental herbs

Notes

References 

 Plants For A Future database report
Calorimetric investigation of the effect of hydroxyanthraquinones in Rheum officinale Baill on Staphylococcus aureus growth
ScienceDirect - The Lancet : Herb-drug interactions

officinale
Plants used in traditional Chinese medicine
Taxa named by Henri Ernest Baillon